Toletxegain is a railway station in Elgoibar, Basque Country, Spain. It is owned by Euskal Trenbide Sarea and operated by Euskotren. It lies on the Bilbao-San Sebastián line.

History 
The Elgoibar-Deba stretch in which the station is located opened in 1893, as part of the San Sebastián-Elgoibar railway. The station was reformed in 2009.

Services 
The station is served by Euskotren Trena line E1. Trains (in both directions) run every hour throughout the week.

References

External links
 

Euskotren Trena stations
Railway stations in Gipuzkoa